The 1923 Virginia Union Panthers football team was an American football team that represented Virginia Union University in the Colored Intercollegiate Athletic Association (CIAA) during the 1923 college football season. In their third and final year under head coach Harold D. Martin, the Panthers compiled a 6–0–2 record and won the CIAA championship. The Panthers were selected by the Pittsburgh Courier as the black college national champion. The team played its home games at Hovey Field in Richmond, Virginia.

Key players included fullback Al Fentress and halfbacks Julius Martin and Leroy Williams. Guard Miller was the only Virginia Union player to receive first-team honors on the 1923 All-CIAA football team selected by committee of the Colored Intercollegiate Athletic Association.

Schedule

Notes

References

Virginia Union
Virginia Union Panthers football seasons
College football undefeated seasons
Black college football national champions
Virginia Union Panthers football